The 1916 Illinois gubernatorial election was held on November 7, 1916. Incumbent Democratic Governor Edward Fitzsimmons Dunne was defeated by Republican nominee Frank Orren Lowden.

Primary elections
Primary elections were held on September 13, 1916.

Democratic primary

Candidates
William B. Brinton, manufacturer
Edward Fitzsimmons Dunne, incumbent Governor
James Traynor

Results

Republican primary

Candidates
Morton D. Hull, State Senator
Frank Orren Lowden, former U.S. Representative for Illinois's 13th congressional district
Frank Leslie Smith, unsuccessful candidate for Republican nomination for Lieutenant Governor in 1904

Results

Progressive primary
No candidates stood in the Progressive primary, and the Progressive Party did not put forward a candidate in the general election.

Results

Socialist primary

Candidates
Seymour Stedman, candidate for Mayor of Chicago in 1915

Results

General election

Candidates
Edward Fitzsimmons Dunne, Democratic
John M. Francis, Socialist Labor, perennial candidate
John R. Golden, Prohibition, pastor and former state legislator
Frank Orren Lowden, Republican
Seymour Stedman, Socialist

Results

See also
1916 Illinois lieutenant gubernatorial election

References

Bibliography
 

1916
Illinois
Gubernatorial
November 1916 events